Roger Browne (born April 13, 1930) is an American actor known best for his work in the peplum and Eurospy films popular in Europe in the 1960s and 1970s.

Career
Roger Browne enrolled in pilot training while serving in the U.S. Air Force, flying the AT-6 trainer aircraft. Browne completed 64 hours of training, including 20 hours of solo flight but was unable to finish due to airsickness and related symptoms of Manifestations of Apprehension (MOA).

In a telephone interview with Monster Kid Radio, Browne said whilst he was studying acting and getting bit roles he supported himself as a physical therapist. One of his clients was going to Rome and asked Roger if he would come with him to carry on his work.  As the 1960 Summer Olympics were under way, Roger eagerly accepted the offer.  He remained in Europe where he was discovered and offered a role in the Jayne Mansfield film It Happened in Athens.  Upon his return to Rome Browne was asked to appear as Mars in Vulcan, Son of Giove and repeated his role in the film Mars, God of War.  With the decline of the sword and sandal genre Browne moved into the Eurospy genre.

Roger lived in Rome from 1960 to 1980 and made films throughout Europe. He had roles in more than 30 films and television shows and dubbed more than 800 films and productions. He served as the president of the English Language Dubbers Association (ELDA) where he claims to have dubbed his voice in 800 films. Roger has worked with Franco Nero, Sophia Loren, Luciano Salce, Anthony Quinn, Vittorio Gassman, Ernest Borgnine, Rita Tushingham, Richard Lester, the Taviani Brothers, Yoko Tani, Gordon Mitchell, Charlie Fawcett, and Jayne Mansfield. He is best known for his role in Argoman the Fantastic Superman (also known as The Incredible Paris Incident and Come rubare la corona d'Inghilterra), 1967. He also appears as himself in the Fine Brothers Elders React series.

Partial filmography

13 Fighting Men (1960) - Pvt. Connors (uncredited)
Heroes Die Young (1960) - Mule
Barabbas (1961) - Gladiator (uncredited)
Pontius Pilate (1962) - Minor Role
Vulcan, Son of Giove (1962) - Mars - God of War
Mars, God of War (1962) - Mars
The Ten Gladiators (a.k.a. I dieci gladiatori) (1963) - Glaucus Valerius
Seven Slaves Against the World (a.k.a. Gli schiavi più forti del mondo) (1964) - Marcus
The Revenge of Spartacus (a.k.a. La vendetta di Spartacus) (1964) - Valerio
Three Swords for Rome (1964) - Fabio
Revenge of the Gladiators (1964)
Seven Rebel Gladiators (a.k.a. Sette contro tutti) (1965) - Marcus Aulus
Super Seven Calling Cairo (a.k.a. Superseven chiama Cairo) (1965) - Martin Stevens / Superseven
Operation Poker (a.k.a. Operazione poker) (1965) - Glenn Foster
Password: Kill Agent Gordon (1966) - Douglas Gordon
The Spy Who Loved Flowers (1966) - Martin Stevens
Rififi in Amsterdam (1966) - Rex Monroe
Un milione di dollari per sette assassini (a.k.a. Last Man to Kill) (1966) - Michael King
Argoman the Fantastic Superman (aka The Incredible Paris Incident) (1967) - Sir Reginald Hoover / Argoman
Assault on the State Treasure (a.k.a. Assalto al tesoro di stato) (1967) - Johnny Quick
È stato bello amarti (1968)
Samoa, Queen of the Jungle (a.k.a. Samoa, regina della giungla) (1968) - Clint Loman
One Day, My Daddy (a.k.a. It Was Nice Loving You) (1968)
Patton (1970) - Soldier on Bridge (uncredited)
Jungle Master (1972) - Lord Carter
The Black Hand (a.k.a. La Mano Nera (Prima della mafia, più della mafia)) (1973) - State Attorney
Women in Cell Block 7 (1973) - Inspector Weil
Mahogany (1975) - Ad Agency Executive
The Big Operator (1976) - James (uncredited)
Emanuelle in America (1977) - The Senator
War of the Robots (1978) - Cmdr. King (uncredited)
Backwards ... March! (a.k.a. Riavanti ... Marsch!) (1979) - General Thompson
Do It with the Pamango (1980) - Harry Brakson
The Lone Road (2016) - Dad
Killer Looks (2018) - Creepy Old Man

References

External links
 

1930 births
Living people
American male film actors